Earth is a live album by Neil Young and Promise of the Real, released on June 17, 2016 on Reprise Records. Recorded during the band's Rebel Content Tour in 2015, the album was produced by Young and John Hanlon and features live performances augmented by studio overdubs and additional nature and animal sounds.

Background 
Young described the album as "a collection of 13 songs from throughout my life, songs I have written about living here on our planet together." The album's mix also includes nature and animal sounds, including turkeys, insects, crows, and thunder. Young said that he was inspired by animals because "they don't have this uptight vibe. They don't have all the hatred and everything."

Young appeared on the podcast WTF with Marc Maron to promote the album. During the interview, he described Earth as "an ear movie" and said that he wanted to break the rules of live recordings. He discussed a scene in the 1992 film Bram Stoker's Dracula where the camera shows the perspective of a flying bat, and said this was an inspiration for the album. He revealed that the French horn part in the Earth version of "After the Gold Rush" was lifted from the master tapes of the original 1970 recording of the song, which he intended to have a disorienting effect. He also revealed that the backup singers on Earth are professional vocalists who primarily record commercial jingles, which he intended as an "edgy" choice. He directed the singers to sing optimistically about Exxon and Monsanto, and "make it sound like a beautiful day."

Prior to a scheduled phone interview with Newsweek, Young's publicist instructed writer Zach Schonfeld to listen to the album in the Pono format. Young hung up on Schonfeld three minutes into the call because he did not believe Schonfeld had listened to the entire record.

Critical reception

Earth has a score of 66 out of 100 on the review aggregator website Metacritic, based on 15 reviews, indicating "generally favorable reviews." In his positive review for AllMusic, Stephen Thomas Erlewine called Earth "one of Young's genuinely inspired nutso albums" and wrote that "animal sounds infect Earth, sometimes swallowing the guitars, sometimes chirping along in rhythm, an effect that is precisely the opposite of natural." Writing for Rolling Stone, David Fricke compared the "urgent" performances to "1991's live Weld cut at Farm Aid with the last-stand fervor of Freedom." Pitchfork Media's Sam Sodomsky wrote that "Simply put, the album would probably be better without [the animal sounds]," but stated that Earth overall "is surprisingly balanced and well-considered," thanks to "the thematic consistency of Young’s songwriting" and the "loose, steady groove" of Promise of the Real. Exclaim!'''s Stuart Henderson called the album "another daft musical statement", criticizing its "barn-based rock'n'roll".

Track listing
All songs written and composed by Neil Young.

Personnel
Neil Young + Promise of the Real
 Neil Young - lead vocals, electric guitar, acoustic guitar, harmonica, pump organ, piano
 Lukas Nelson - guitar, piano, backing vocals
 Micah Nelson - electric guitar, electric charango, backing vocals
 Corey McCormick - bass guitar, backing vocals
 Tato Melger - percussion
 Anthony Logerfo - drums

Additional musicians
 DRAM - additional vocal ("People Want to Hear About Love")
 Nico Segal - trumpet ("People Want to Hear About Love")
 Joe Yankee - bass ("Mother Earth")
 Bill Peterson - flugelhorn ("After the Gold Rush")
 Studio backing vocals:
 Charissa Nelson
 Windy Wagner
 Christine Helferich Gutter
 Suzanne Waters
 Eric Bradley
 Gerald White
 Jasper Randall
 Brian Chapman
 Darrell Brown - studio backing vocal arrangements

Recording personnel
 Neil Young - producer, mixing, wildlife recording
 John Hanlon - producer, mixing, wildlife recording
 Eric Lynn - engineer, wildlife recording
 Johnnie Burik - assistant engineer, wildlife recording
 Tim Mulligan - live mix and recording
 Dave Lohr - live mix and recording
 Dana Nielsen - studio backing vocal recording
 Jake Valentine - studio backing vocal recording assistant
 Joey Vitas - studio backing vocal recording assistant
 Billy Centenaro - studio backing vocal recording assistant
 Kevin Smith - wildlife recording
 Will Mitchell - wildlife recording
 Chris Bellman - mastering

Artwork
 Gary Burden - art direction and design
 Jenice Heo - art direction and design
 DH Lovelife - Earth'' cover logo design and painting, back and inside cover photography
 Richard Hammar - CD label photography

Charts

References

2016 live albums
Neil Young live albums
Reprise Records live albums
Albums produced by Neil Young
Albums produced by John Hanlon
Lukas Nelson & Promise of the Real albums